The 2008 Florida State Seminoles football team represented Florida State University during the 2008 NCAA Division I FBS football season. The team was coached by Bobby Bowden and played their home games at Doak Campbell Stadium in Tallahassee, Florida. It was Florida State's 17th season as a member of the Atlantic Coast Conference (ACC).

The Seminoles were without as many as 12 scholarship players for the first three games of the season because of suspensions carrying over from the previous season for violating team rules, although it has not been disclosed how many of those were involved with an academic cheating scandal at the school. Junior wide receiver Preston Parker was suspended for the first two games of the season, after pleading guilty to two misdemeanor charges.

Rankings

Schedule

Recruits

Game capsules

Western Carolina
Pregame Line: Lines are not released when an FCS team plays an FBS team.

The start of the game was delayed almost an hour and a half due to lightning in the area, and then almost another hour during the 1st quarter. The first player to touch the ball for FSU, to start the 2008 season, was Tony Carter who promptly returned a punt 68 yards for a touchdown and the game's first score. Sophomore Christian Ponder started his first game at quarterback. Ponder completed 11 of 17 passes for 196 yards and 3 touchdowns. At the start of the second drive in the second half (when FSU was up 35–0), sophomore D'Vontrey Richardson came into the game. Richardson went 5 for 6 through the air with one touchdown and also had two rushing touchdowns, one for over 50 yards. With several players serving suspensions due to the school wide "academic scandal" (several students and athletes were caught sharing answers in an online music class), the Seminoles had 28 freshman play in the game. Two of those freshman had touchdowns in the victory over the Catamounts.

Chattanooga
Pregame Line: Lines are not released when an FCS team plays an FBS team.

In his second start as a collegiate athlete, Christian Ponder threw for 183 yards and three first-half touchdowns before being relieved by D'vontrey Richardson in the 3rd quarter. Richardson threw for 117 yards with one touchdown. Richardson also had a 55-yard rushing touchdown, the longest scoring run for a quarterback in the school's history. The previous record was held by Richardson himself, set in the previous week with a 52-yard touchdown run. Junior Wide Receiver, Corey Surrency, led Florida State in receiving with 87 yards and two touchdowns on just three receptions. Florida State's defense allowed their first score of the season after a 62-yard passing touchdown thrown by Chattanooga quarterback Tony Pastore. This was also the first score by Chattanooga against Florida State all-time, dating back to 1984, the only previous meeting between the two schools in which the Seminoles won in a shutout by 37 points.

#18 Wake Forest
Pregame Line: Florida State −4

Defense, kicking game help No. 18 Wake Forest clip No. 24 (AP Poll) Florida State

Colorado
Pregame Line: Florida State −6

This game was played in Jacksonville, Florida with Florida State as the home team. This was Bobby Bowden's 500th Career Game.

Bowden gets Florida State past Colorado in 500th game

@ Miami
Pregame Line: Miami −2.5

FSU dumps Miami behind Smith's career-best four TDs

@ N.C. State
Pregame Line: Pick 'em

Florida State rides Ponder, Smith past N.C. State

Virginia Tech
Pregame Line: Florida State −6

Carr sets up two TDs in third quarter as No. 25 FSU rallies

@ Georgia Tech
Pregame Line: Georgia Tech −1.5

Georgia Tech snaps 0–12 skid against Florida State

Clemson
Pregame Line: Florida State −7

FSU bowl eligible for 27th straight season on Bowden's birthday

Boston College
Pregame Line: Florida State −7

One day prior to the game, Florida State suspended Wide Receivers Taiwan Easterling, Bert Reed, Corey Surrency, Cameron Wade and Richard Goodman for their roles in an on-campus altercation with members of the Phi Beta Sigma fraternity at Florida State's student union.

Boston College upends No. 19 Florida State day after five wideouts suspended

@ #25 Maryland
Pregame Line: Maryland −1

Myron Rolle, Florida State's starting safety, was interviewed in Birmingham, Alabama at noon for the Rhodes Scholarship. At 5:00, he received the call that he was accepted. He flew in a private jet to Washington, D.C. and had a police escort take him to the game in College Park, Maryland. He arrived at the stadium around 8:30pm (with 11:55 left in the 2nd quarter). He dressed out in the locker room and walked onto the field to the roar of the Florida State visitor section with 6:23 left in the 2nd quarter. After stretching out, he made his game debut with 1:30 left in the 1st half. At the end of the game, his teammates showered him with a bucket of ice water in 26 degree weather, an act usually reserved for the head coach. He is the first Florida State player to ever have the "ice water shower".

Maryland picked apart by unranked Florida State

#4 Florida
Pregame Line: Florida −16.5

Florida wins 8th straight while continuing dominance in intrastate rivalry

Champs Sports Bowl vs. Wisconsin
Pregame Line:

Ponder powers Seminoles' offense, defense routs Badgers

Rankings

Statistics

Team

Scores by quarter

Projected 2008 depth chart

Offensive
QB – Christian Ponder so
TB – Antone Smith  sr
FB – Seddrick Holloway jr
WR – Preston Parker jr
WR – Greg Carr  sr
TE – Jonathan Hannah  jr
LT – Rodney Hudson so
LG – Evan Bellamy so
C  – Ryan McMahon so
RG – Will Furlong fr
RT – Antwane Greenlee fr

Defense
DE – Neefy Moffett sr
DE – Everette Brown jr
DT – Budd Thacker  jr
DT – Paul Griffin  sr
LB – Derek Nicholson sr
LB – Kendall Smith so
LB – Toddrick Verdell jr
CB – Tony Carter sr
CB – Michael Ray Garvin sr
S  – Myron Rolle jr
S  – Darius McClure sr

Special Teams
K – Zack Hubby so
P – Shawn Powell fr
K,P – Graham Gano was expected to start at both positions, but had a knee injury during two a days. He is expected back by the Colorado game.

References

Florida State
Florida State Seminoles football seasons
Cheez-It Bowl champion seasons
Florida State Seminoles football